

Peerage of England 

|Duke of Cornwall (1337)||none||1422||1453||
|-
|Duke of York (1385)||Richard of York, 3rd Duke of York||1426||1460||
|-
|rowspan="2"|Duke of Norfolk (1397)||John de Mowbray, 2nd Duke of Norfolk||1424||1432||Died
|-
|John de Mowbray, 3rd Duke of Norfolk||1432||1461||
|-
|Duke of Bedford (1414)||John of Lancaster, 1st Duke of Bedford||1414||1435||Died, title extinct
|-
|Duke of Gloucester (1414)||Humphrey of Lancaster, 1st Duke of Gloucester||1414||1447||
|-
|rowspan="2"|Earl of Warwick (1088)||Richard de Beauchamp, 13th Earl of Warwick||1401||1439||Died
|-
|Henry de Beauchamp, 14th Earl of Warwick||1439||1446||
|-
|rowspan="3"|Earl of Arundel (1138)||John FitzAlan, 14th Earl of Arundel||1421||1435||Died
|-
|Humphrey FitzAlan, 15th Earl of Arundel||1435||1438||Died
|-
|William FitzAlan, 16th Earl of Arundel||1438||1487||
|-
|Earl of Oxford (1142)||John de Vere, 12th Earl of Oxford||1417||1462||
|-
|Earl of Devon (1335)||Thomas de Courtenay, 5th Earl of Devon||1422||1458||
|-
|Earl of Salisbury (1337)||Alice Montacute, 5th Countess of Salisbury||1428||1462||
|-
|Earl of Stafford (1351)||Humphrey Stafford, 6th Earl of Stafford||1403||1460||
|-
|Earl of Suffolk (1385)||William de la Pole, 4th Earl of Suffolk||1415||1450||
|-
|Earl of Huntingdon (1387)||John Holland, 2nd Earl of Huntingdon||1417||1447||
|-
|Earl of Somerset (1397)||John Beaufort, 3rd Earl of Somerset||1418||1444||
|-
|Earl of Westmorland (1397)||Ralph Neville, 2nd Earl of Westmorland||1425||1484||
|-
|Earl of Northumberland (1416)||Henry Percy, 2nd Earl of Northumberland||1416||1455||
|-
|rowspan="2"|Baron de Ros (1264)||Thomas de Ros, 8th Baron de Ros||1421||1431||Died
|-
|Thomas de Ros, 9th Baron de Ros||1421||1464||
|-
|Baron Fauconberg (1295)||Joan Neville, 6th Baroness Fauconberg||1429||1490||
|- 
|rowspan="2"|Baron FitzWalter (1295)||Walter FitzWalter, 7th Baron FitzWalter||1415||1431||Died
|- 
|Elizabeth Radcliffe, suo jure Baroness FitzWalter||1431||1485||
|- 
|Baron FitzWarine (1295)||Thomazine FitzWarine, suo jure Baroness FitzWarine||1433||1471||
|- 
|Baron Grey de Wilton (1295)||Richard Grey, 6th Baron Grey de Wilton||1396||1442||
|-
|rowspan="2"|Baron Clinton (1299)||William de Clinton, 4th Baron Clinton||1398||1431||Died
|- 
|John de Clinton, 5th Baron Clinton||1431||1464||
|- 
|Baron De La Warr (1299)||Reginald West, 6th Baron De La Warr||1427||1450||
|- 
|rowspan="2"|Baron Ferrers of Chartley (1299)||Edmund de Ferrers, 6th Baron Ferrers of Chartley||1413||1435||Died
|- 
|William de Ferrers, 7th Baron Ferrers of Chartley||1435||1450||
|- 
|Baron Lovel (1299)||William Lovel, 7th Baron Lovel||1414||1455||
|- 
|Baron Scales (1299)||Thomas de Scales, 7th Baron Scales||1419||1460||
|- 
|Baron Welles (1299)||Lionel de Welles, 6th Baron Welles||1421||1461||
|- 
|Baron de Clifford (1299)||Thomas Clifford, 8th Baron de Clifford||1422||1455||
|- 
|Baron Ferrers of Groby (1299)||William Ferrers, 5th Baron Ferrers of Groby||1388||1445||
|- 
|Baron Furnivall (1299)||John Talbot, 6th Baron Furnivall||1407||1453||jure uxoris
|- 
|Baron Latimer (1299)||John Nevill, 6th Baron Latimer||1395||1430||Died, his heirs never assumed the title
|- 
|rowspan="2"|Baron Morley (1299)||Thomas de Morley, 5th Baron Morley||1416||1435||Died
|- 
|Robert de Morley, 6th Baron Morley||1435||1442||
|- 
|Baron Strange of Knockyn (1299)||Richard le Strange, 7th Baron Strange of Knockyn||1397||1449||
|- 
|Baron Zouche of Haryngworth (1308)||William la Zouche, 5th Baron Zouche||1415||1463||
|- 
|Baron Beaumont (1309)||John Beaumont, 6th Baron Beaumont||1416||1460||
|- 
|Baron Audley of Heleigh (1313)||James Tuchet, 5th Baron Audley||1408||1459||
|- 
|rowspan="2"|Baron Cobham of Kent (1313)||Joan Oldcastle, 4th Baroness Cobham||1408||1434||Died
|- 
|Joan Brooke, 5th Baroness Cobham||1434||1442||
|- 
|Baron Willoughby de Eresby (1313)||Robert Willoughby, 6th Baron Willoughby de Eresby||1409||1452||
|- 
|Baron Dacre (1321)||Thomas Dacre, 6th Baron Dacre||1398||1458||
|- 
|Baron FitzHugh (1321)||William FitzHugh, 4th Baron FitzHugh||1425||1452||
|- 
|rowspan="2"|Baron Greystock (1321)||John de Greystock, 4th Baron Greystock||1417||1436||Died
|- 
|Ralph de Greystock, 5th Baron Greystock||1436||1487||
|- 
|Baron Grey of Ruthin (1325)||Reginald Grey, 3rd Baron Grey de Ruthyn||1388||1441||
|- 
|Baron Harington (1326)||William Harington, 5th Baron Harington||1418||1458||
|- 
|Baron Burghersh (1330)||Isabel le Despencer, suo jure Baroness Burgersh||1414||1440||
|- 
|Baron Poynings (1337)||Robert Poynings, 5th Baron Poynings||1387||1446||
|- 
|rowspan="2"|Baron Bourchier (1342)||Elizabeth Bourchier, suo jure Baroness Bourchier||1409||1433||Died
|- 
|Henry Bourchier, 5th Baron Bourchier||1433||1483||
|- 
|Baron Scrope of Masham (1350)||John Scrope, 4th Baron Scrope of Masham||1426||1455||
|- 
|Baron Botreaux (1368)||William de Botreaux, 3rd Baron Botreaux||1392||1462||
|- 
|Baron Scrope of Bolton (1371)||Henry Scrope, 4th Baron Scrope of Bolton||1420||1459||
|- 
|Baron Cromwell (1375)||Ralph de Cromwell, 3rd Baron Cromwell||1417||1455||
|- 
|Baron Bergavenny (1392)||Elizabeth de Beauchamp, suo jure Baroness Bergavenny||1421||1447||
|- 
|rowspan="2"|Baron Grey of Codnor (1397)||John Grey, 2nd Baron Grey of Codnor||1418||1431||Died
|- 
|Henry Grey, 3rd Baron Grey of Codnor||1431||1444||
|- 
|Baron Berkeley (1421)||James Berkeley, 1st Baron Berkeley||1421||1463||
|- 
|Baron Hungerford (1426)||Walter Hungerford, 1st Baron Hungerford||1426||1449||
|- 
|Baron Tiptoft (1426)||John de Tiptoft, 1st Baron Tiptoft||1426||1443||
|- 
|Baron Latimer (1432)||George Neville, 1st Baron Latimer||1432||1469||New creation
|- 
|Baron Fanhope (1433)||John Cornwall, 1st Baron Fanhope||1433||1443||New creation
|- 
|}

Peerage of Scotland

|rowspan=2|Duke of Rothesay (1398)||Alexander Stewart, Duke of Rothesay||1430||1430||Died
|-
|James Stewart, Duke of Rothesay||1430||1437||Acceded to the Throne of Scotland
|-
|Earl of Mar (1114)||Alexander Stewart, Earl of Mar||1408||1435||Died; for de jure Earl of Mar 1438–1565 see Lords Erskine below
|-
|Earl of Dunbar (1115)||George II, Earl of March||1420||1457||
|-
|Earl of Lennox (1184)||Isabella, Countess of Lennox||1425||1458||
|-
|Earl of Ross (1215)||Alexander of Islay, Earl of Ross||1429||1449||
|-
|Earl of Sutherland (1235)||John de Moravia, 7th Earl of Sutherland||1427||1460||
|-
|rowspan=2|Earl of Douglas (1358)||Archibald Douglas, 5th Earl of Douglas||14240||1439||Died
|-
|William Douglas, 6th Earl of Douglas||1439||1440||
|-
|Earl of Strathearn (1371)||Walter Stewart, Earl of Atholl||1427||1437||Executed for treason, and his titles were forfeited
|-
|Earl of Moray (1372)||Elizabeth Dunbar, 8th Countess of Moray||1429||1455||
|-
|Earl of Orkney (1379)||William Sinclair, Earl of Orkney||1410||1476||
|-
|Earl of Buchan (1382)||Robert Stewart, Earl of Buchan||1424||1431||Died, title extinct
|-
|rowspan=2|Earl of Angus (1389)||William Douglas, 2nd Earl of Angus||1403||1437||Died
|-
|James Douglas, 3rd Earl of Angus||1437||1446||
|-
|rowspan=2|Earl of Crawford (1398)||Alexander Lindsay, 2nd Earl of Crawford||1407||1439||Died
|-
|David Lindsay, 3rd Earl of Crawford||1439||1446||
|-
|Earl of Atholl (1404)||Walter Stewart, Earl of Atholl||1404||1437||Executed for treason, and his titles were forfeited
|-
|Earl of Menteith (1427)||Malise Graham, 1st Earl of Menteith||1427||1490||
|-
|Earl of Avondale (1437)||James Douglas, 1st Earl of Avondale||1437||1443||New creation
|-
|Lord Erskine (1429)||Robert Erskine, 1st Lord Erskine||1429||1453||de jure 12th Earl of Mar
|-
|Lord Hay (1429)||William Hay, 1st Lord Hay||1429||1462||
|-
|rowspan=2|Lord Somerville (1430)||Thomas Somerville, 1st Lord Somerville||1430||1438||New creation
|-
|William Somerville, 2nd Lord Somerville||1438||1456||
|-
|Lord Lorne (1439)||Robert Stewart, 1st Lord of Lorne||1439||1449||
|-
|}

Peerage of Ireland

|Earl of Ulster (1264)||Richard of York, 8th Earl of Ulster||1425||1460||
|-
|rowspan=3|Earl of Kildare (1316)||Gerald FitzGerald, 5th Earl of Kildare||1390||1432||Died
|-
|John FitzGerald, 6th Earl of Kildare||1432||1434||Died
|-
|Thomas FitzGerald, 7th Earl of Kildare||1434||1478||
|-
|Earl of Ormond (1328)||James Butler, 4th Earl of Ormond||1405||1452||
|-
|Earl of Desmond (1329)||James FitzGerald, 6th Earl of Desmond||1420||1463||
|-
|Baron Athenry (1172)||Thomas II de Bermingham||1428||1473||
|-
|rowspan=2|Baron Kingsale (1223)||Nicholas de Courcy, 10th Baron Kingsale||1410||1430||Died
|-
|Patrick de Courcy, 11th Baron Kingsale||1430||1460||
|-
|Baron Kerry (1223)||Thomas Fitzmaurice, 8th Baron Kerry||1410||1469||
|-
|Baron Barry (1261)||William Barry, 8th Baron Barry||1420||1480||
|-
|Baron Gormanston (1370)||Christopher Preston, 3rd Baron Gormanston||1422||1450||
|-
|rowspan=2|Baron Slane (1370)||Thomas Fleming, 2nd Baron Slane||1370||1435||Died
|-
|Christopher Fleming, 3rd Baron Slane||1435||1446||
|-
|rowspan=2|Baron Howth (1425)||Christopher St Lawrence, 1st Baron Howth||1425||1430||Died
|-
|Christopher St Lawrence, 2nd Baron Howth||1430||1465||
|-
|}

References

 

Lists of peers by decade
1430s in England
1430s in Ireland
15th century in England
15th century in Scotland
15th century in Ireland
15th-century English people
15th-century Scottish peers
15th-century Irish people
Peers